The Rotex Electric REB 90 is a Czech electric motor for powering electric aircraft, designed and produced by Rotex Electric of Prague.

Design and development
The REB 90 is a brushless 350 volt design producing . The low working rpm of 1800-2400 means that it can turn a propeller at efficient speeds without the need for a reduction drive.

Specifications (REB 90)

See also

References

External links

Aircraft electric engines
Rotex Electric aircraft engines